Dipak Banerjee (1930-2007) was an Indian economist. He obtained his Bachelor, later on Doctorate from the London School of Economics and taught at Presidency College, Calcutta where he eventually became head of the economics department. Among his students at Presidency were many noted Indian economists, such as Bhaskar Dutta, Subhashis Gangopadhyay, Dilip Mukherjee and Debraj Ray. His wife Nirmala Patankar is also an economist, as is his son, the Nobel Prize winner Abhijit Banerjee.

References

Indian economists
1930 births
2007 deaths